Snowshoe Lake is a small alpine lake located in the Cabinet Mountains in northwestern Montana. It is within the boundaries of Kaniksu National Forest. Snowshoe Peak overlooks the lake. Granite Lake and Leigh Lake are also located nearby.

References 

Lakes of Montana